István Grózner (22 July 1955 – 16 September 1993) was a Hungarian equestrian. He competed in two events at the 1980 Summer Olympics.

References

External links
 

1955 births
1993 deaths
Hungarian male equestrians
Olympic equestrians of Hungary
Equestrians at the 1980 Summer Olympics
Sportspeople from Zala County